Cryptocotyle is a genus of trematodes from the family Heterophyidae. The definitive hosts of the parasites are fish-eating birds and mammals.

Species
 Cryptocotyle americana Ciurea, 1924
 Cryptocotyle badamshini (Kurochkin, 1959)
 Cryptocotyle concava (Creplin, 1825)
 Cryptocotyle cryptocotyloides (Issaitschikow, 1923)
 Cryptocotyle delamurei (Jurachno, 1987)
 Cryptocotyle jejuna (Nicoll, 1907)
 Cryptocotyle lingua (Creplin, 1825)
 Cryptocotyle macrorhinis (MacCallum, 1916)

Sources

 

 
Digenea genera